The 1997 Amstel Gold Race was the 32nd edition of the annual road bicycle race "Amstel Gold Race", held on Sunday April 26, 1997, in the Dutch province of Limburg. The race stretched 258 kilometres, with the start in Heerlen and the finish in Maastricht. There were a total number of 191 competitors, with 80 cyclists finishing the race.

Result

External links
 Results
 
 

Amstel Gold Race
1997 in road cycling
1997 in Dutch sport
Amstel Gold Race
April 1997 sports events in Europe